Brittania Sportswear Ltd was a Wyomissing, PA-based clothing company best known for women's jeans in the 1970s and 1980s.  It is not to be confused with Britannia Clothing Company, a United Kingdom clothing company.

Brittania Sportswear was launched in 1973 by Walter Schoenfeld in Seattle, WA   It once reached sales of $300 million a year and was the country's top-selling blue jean. It plummeted into Chapter 11 bankruptcy protection in 1983 because of management problems and changes in fashion tastes. The company was eventually purchased in 1987 by Levi Strauss & Co. It was sold to VF Jeans (parent of Wrangler and Lee brands) in 1997.

References

Clothing companies of the United States
Jeans by brand